Ladies Night  is a recording by guitarist Preston Reed. It was re-released in 2004 on Outer Bridge Records (OB1003) with three bonus tracks included.

Track listing
All songs by Preston Reed.
 "Ladies Night"
 "Running"
 "Hijacker"
 "Hyperjig"
 "Somehow We'll Make it Home"
 "Mermaid Eyes"
 "Seven"
 "Accufuse"
 "Pacific"
 "Rainmaker"
2004 reissue bonus tracks:
 "About You"
 "Brazilia"
 "Synchromesh"

Personnel
Preston Reed – 6 & 12-string acoustic guitars

References

1996 albums
Preston Reed albums